Mainaguri is a Town and a Municipality in the Jalpaiguri Sadar subdivision of the Jalpaiguri district in the state of West Bengal, India. It is known as the "Gateway of the Dooars" and is a regionally significant tourist destination for "Jalpesh Temple" of Lord Shiva and nearby Gorumara National Park.

Geography

Area overview
The map alongside shows the alluvial floodplains south of the outer foothills of the Himalayas. The area is mostly flat, except for low hills in the northern portions. It is a primarily rural area with 62.01% of the population living in rural areas and a moderate 37.99% living in the urban areas. Tea gardens in the Dooars and Terai regions produce 226 million kg or over a quarter of India's total tea crop.  Some tea gardens were identified in the 2011 census as census towns or villages. Such places are marked in the map as CT (census town) or R (rural/ urban centre). Specific tea estate pages are marked TE.

Note: The map alongside presents some of the notable locations in the subdivision. All places marked in the map are linked in the larger full screen map.

Location
It has an average elevation of 84 metres (275 feet).

Mainaguri is about 10 km north-east of Jalpaiguri and 50 km from Siliguri. Local attractions include Jalpesh Temple, Gorumara National Park and Chapramari Wildlife Sanctuary. The nearest airport is Civil Enclave Bagdogra, and the nearest railway station is New Mainaguri.

Five roads connect Mainaguri with
 Siliguri, Jalpaiguri (West)
 Alipurduar, Cooch Behar (East) 
 Changrabandha, Mathabhanga (South)
 Malbazar, Lataguri (North)
 Ramsai (North-west).

Civic administration
Maynaguri is mainly governed by Mainaguri Municipality. Maynaguri covers 17 wards spread across Madhabdanga-I and Maynaguri panchayats and parts of Khagrabari-I and Domohoni-I panchayats of Maynaguri block.

Police station
Mainaguri police has jurisdiction over Maynaguri CD block.

CD block HQ 
Headquarters of Maynaguri CD block is at Mainaguri.

Demographics
According to the 2011 Census of India, Mainaguri had a total population of 30,490 of which 15,487 (51%) were males and 15,003 (49%) were females. There were 2,951 persons in the age range of 0 to 6 years. The total number of literate people in Mainaguri was 24,408 (88.63% of the population over 6 years).

 India census, Mainaguri had a population of 27,086. Males constitute 51% of the population and females 49%. Mainaguri has an average literacy rate of 75%, higher than the national average of 59.5%: male literacy is 80%, and female literacy is 70%. 
In Mainaguri, 11% of the population is under 6 years of age.
 
In 2021, Maynaguri municipality was formed comprising Maynaguri census town and  Madhabdanga-I and Maynaguri panchayats and parts of Khagrabari-I and Domohoni-I panchayats of Maynaguri block. The population of the new municipality was 45,045.

Infrastructure

According to the District Census Handbook 2011, Jalpaiguri, Mainaguri covered an area of 12.38 km2. Among the civic amenities, it had 28 km roads with open drains, the protected water supply involved overhead tanks, uncovered wells. It had 3,458 domestic electric connections, 518 road lighting points. Among the medical facilities it had 1 hospital, 3 dispensaries/ health centres, 30 medicine shops. Among the educational facilities it had 12 primary schools, 5 middle schools, 5 secondary schools, 5 senior secondary schools. It had 4 recognised shorthand, typewriting and vocational training centre, 24 non-formal education centres (Sarva Shiksha Abhiyan), 1 special school for the disabled. Among the social, recreational and cultural facilities it had 1 cinema theatre, 1 auditorium/ community hall, 1 public library. Three important commodities it produced were: furniture, jute yarn, tea. It had branches of 2 nationalised banks, 1 private commercial bank and 1 cooperative bank.

Education
Maynaguri College established in 1999. affiliated by North Bengal University.

Maynaguri Government Polytechnic College. established in 2015. approved by AICTE & affiliated by WBSCTE.

Manoranjan Saha Memorial B.ed College established in 2010. affiliated by WBUTTEPA University & approved by National Council for Teacher Education. Also known as Maynaguri B.ed College. This college offers B.ed & D.El.Ed Courses.
Maynaguri Government Iti established in 2016.This iti recognized by National Council for Vocational Education and Training and under the 'Directorate of Industrial Training' (DIT),West Bengal.
Maynaguri High School(H.S). established in 1946. Also known as Maynaguri Boy's School.
Maynaguri Girl's High School.established in 1947.
Maynaguri Shubashnagar High School. established in 1962.
Shahidgarh High School.established in 1966.

Radhika Library, has been operating here since 1910. Radhikanath Nandi who was the Deputy Collector of the Khasmahal office at Mainaguri, helped to begin the library. At the beginning, 1 anna was decided as the monthly fees of the library. It used to be a rural library. It was upgraded as town library on 1 March 1983. It has more than 14,000 books and around 600 members.

Transport
Road:

The main mode of transport in the area is roadways. Most of the places are well connected by roads and to rest of India. National Highway 27 (India) is the main highway of the area. Regular bus services provided by North Bengal State Transport Corporation and Assam State Transport Corporation and other private parties run between all important places of the area. Share jeeps and maxi-taxies are quite popular in the area.

Rail:

Mainaguri lies in the Northeast Frontier Railway zone of the Indian Railways. There are railway links to the rest of the country directly and via Kolkata. The major railway junction of New Jalpaiguri (Code:NJP) is 45 km from the town. New Mainaguri railway station (NMX) serves the town directly. Another rail station of this city is Maynaguri Road Railway Station (MYGD). It is about 5 km from the city. Maynaguri Road station is an important station of Malbazar-Changrabandha. Previously it was known as Doars railway. Mainaguri Road station is also 'Y' connected with New Maynaguri and New Domohoni rail station.

Places of interest

Jalpesh Temple
The Jalpesh Temple is approximately 3 kilometres from away Mainaguri , and is dedicated to Lord Jalpeshwar (Siva). The temple was built in a style akin to Islamic architecture. Inside the temple, there is a Shivling called 'Anadi'. Mahashivaratri is the main festival celebrated in this temple, which is 126 feet high and 120 feet wide. Pilgrims come during Sravani Mela in July–August and during the fair of Jalpesh Mela in February–March to offer special puja to Siva. After worshipping, devotees, whose number reach approximately 1.2 million, collect water from River Teesta and walk barefoot 15 kilometres to the temple.

Jalpesh Temple was founded by Bisu Singh of Cooch Behar in A.D. 1524. His son, Maharaja Narayan, rebuilt the temple in A.D. 1563. Pran Narayan in turn rebuilt the temple in A.D. 1663

Other places

 Jatileswar Temple(dedicated to Lord Jatileshwara or Lord Shiva)
 Bateshwar Temple
 Mahakal Temple
 Ramsai Wildlife(Gorumara National Park)
 Khuksiya Park
 Maynaguri Shishu Uddyan
 Maynaguri Football field

Culture

Festivals
Various festivals are celebrated throughout the year. Kali Puja of Mainaguri is renowned. It also celebrates Eid and Christmas Day with similar pompousness.

Sports and entertainment 
Mainaguri has a famous playground (Known as Mainaguri Football Ground) where several football tournaments are held every year.

Other than that several fairs like Boishakhi Mela, Mela during Durga Puja, book fair, one yearly cultural function organised by local clubs is also held. This ground is an inseparable part of the people of Mainaguri.

Healthcare
Maynaguri Rural Hospital, with 60 beds at Mainaguri, is the major government medical facility in the Maynaguri CD block.

References

Cities and towns in Jalpaiguri district